The 1951–52 1re série season was the 31st season of the 1re série, the top level of ice hockey in France. Seven teams participated in the league, and Chamonix Hockey Club won their 13th league title. Due to the final round being cancelled because of heavy snowfall, it was decided that a game between Chamonix Hockey Club (representing the Alpes Group) and CO Billancourt (representing the Paris Group) would be played for the championship.

First round

Paris Group

Alpes Group

Final 
 CA Billancourt - Chamonix Hockey Club 3:6

External links
Season on hockeyarchives.info

Fra
1951–52 in French ice hockey
Ligue Magnus seasons